Roxburgh College is a state secondary school in Roxburgh Park, Victoria, Australia. Previously Upfield Secondary College, the school completed its transition to the current site at Roxburgh Park during 2005. The school offers years 7–12, with the option of VCE, VET and VCAL education for senior students.

In 2017 Roxburgh College opened a Trade Training center, which has spaces for Automotive, Electronics, wood work and metal work fabrication.

Notable alumni
 Richard Kennar – Samoan-Australian rugby league player for the Melbourne Storm
 Ahmed Saad – AFL St Kilda player
 Young Tonumaipea – Samoan-Australian rugby league player for the Melbourne Storm

References

External links
 Official website

Public high schools in Victoria (Australia)
2003 establishments in Australia
Educational institutions established in 2003
Buildings and structures in the City of Hume